The 1952 Soviet Cup was an association football cup competition of the Soviet Union.

Competition schedule

First round
 [Aug 24] 
 Stroitel Leninakan           2-2  DO Tashkent 
   [Boyajan-2, Suetin, Mavromatis] 
 [Sep 6] 
 DO Petrozavodsk              0-13 DINAMO Yerevan           [in Leningrad] 
   [Viktor Merkulov-5, Karajan-5, Arutyun Kegeyan-2, Abramyan] 
 [Sep 7] 
 ODO Ashkhabad                0-5  TORPEDO Stalingrad 
   [Mikhail Gurkin-2, Serafim Arzamastsev-2, Makarashvili] 
 [Sep 21] 
 DINAMO-2 Stalinabad          w/o  Kalev Tallinn 
 Metallurg Zaporozhye         2-4  SPARTAK Vilnius 
   [O.Kiknadze, N.Malakhov – R.Prihockis, M.Dauksa, S.Petraitis, M.Skelovas]

First round replays
 [Aug 25] 
 STROITEL Leninakan           2-0  DO Tashkent 
   [Petrosyan, Boyajan]

Second round
 [Aug 24] 
 Dinamo-2 Moskva              0-1  DO Kiev 
   [Ognyov] 
 [Aug 27] 
 Krylya Sovetov Molotov       1-2  DINAMO Alma-Ata  
 [Sep 7] 
 DO Riga                      5-1  Krasnaya Zvezda Petrozavodsk  
   [Balykin-2, Lysenkov-2, Ogerchuk – Starovoitov pen] 
 MVO Kalinin                  4-2  Dinamo Kiev                  [aet] 
   [Valentin Nikolayev 45, Alexei Grinin 53, Vladimir Dyomin 77, 104 – Viktor Zhilin 5, Zoltan Sengetovskiy 48] 
 Shakhtyor Stalino            1-3  LOKOMOTIV Moskva 
   [Ivan Fedosov 24 – Boris Lagutin 9, Igor Petrov 34, Boris Pirogov 85] 
 ZiB Baku                     0-5  DO Sverdlovsk 
   [Listochkin-3, Ivanov, Bushuyev] 
 [Sep 8] 
 Spartak Minsk                0-2  DO Tbilisi 
   [A.Paichadze 37, A.Khurtsidze 70] 
 [Sep 9] 
 DO Vilnius                   0-0  Burevestnik Kishinev 
 [Sep 11] 
 Dinamo Tashkent              0-5  NEFTYANIK Baku 
   [A.Terentyev-2, Kuznetsov, Anoshkin, Mamedov] 
 [Sep 12] 
 Torpedo Moskva               0-0  Dinamo Yerevan 
 VMS-2 Leningrad              0-2  LOKOMOTIV Kharkov 
   [Georgiy Borzenko, Bespaly] 
 [Sep 14] 
 KBF Tallinn                  1-0  Krasnoye Znamya Ivanovo 
   [V.Borzenkov 50] 
 [Sep 28] 
 DINAMO Minsk                 3-2  Krylya Sovetov Kuibyshev     [aet] 
   [Anatoliy Yegorov, Ivan Mozer, Nikolai Makarov – Yuriy Belousov, Fyodor Novikov] 
 [Oct 5] 
 Burevestnik Bendery          3-6  VMS Moskva 
   [Kuzmin-2, Khodorovskiy – Yevgeniy Bologov-2, A.Murashov-2, Viktor Rogov] 
 DINAMO Frunze                w/o  Dinamo Stalinabad 
 Spartak Vilnius              1-1  Torpedo Stalingrad 
   [Vitautas Saunoris – K.Dubovitskiy] 
 STROITEL Leninakan           w/o  Dinamo-2 Stalinabad 
 TORPEDO Gorkiy               3-2  Stroitel Ust-Kamenogorsk 
   [Alexandr Denisov 12, Vladimir Lazarev 26, Viktor Gorbunov 40 - ? 68, ? 84]

Second round replays
 [Sep 10] 
 DO Vilnius                   1-0  Burevestnik Kishinev 
   [Polevoi (B) og] 
 [Sep 13] 
 TORPEDO Moskva               1-0  Dinamo Yerevan 
   [Vitaliy Vatskevich] 
 [Oct 6] 
 Spartak Vilnius              1-2  TORPEDO Stalingrad 
   [Georgiy Shmakov (T) og – Popov, Serafim Arzamastsev]

Third round
 [Aug 24] 
 TTU Tbilisi                  1-1  Spartak Ashkhabad 
   [Petrosov – Kuchumov] 
 [Sep 4] 
 Daugava Riga                 1-1  Dinamo Leningrad 
   [Alfons Jegers – Alexei Kolobov] 
 [Sep 13] 
 TORPEDO Moskva               2-0  Stroitel Leninakan 
   [Yuriy Zolotov 36, Ivan Gorovoi 82] 
 [Sep 28] 
 DO Vilnius                   w/o  Dinamo Frunze 
 [Oct 5] 
 MVO Kalinin                  4-1  DO Tbilisi 
   [Alexei Grinin-3, Boris Koverznev – Saakashvili] 
 [Oct 8] 
 DO Sverdlovsk                5-1  Dinamo Alma-Ata 
   [Listochkin-3, Ivanov, Kozhevnikov – Petrov] 
 [Oct 10] 
 Neftyanik Baku               2-2  VMS Moskva 
   [Baskov, Mamedov – Yevgeniy Bologov, A.Murashov] 
 [Oct 12] 
 DO Kiev                      2-0  KBF Tallinn 
   [V.Sevastyanov, A.Voronin] 
 LOKOMOTIV Kharkov            2-0  DO Riga 
   [V.Bespaly-2] 
 LOKOMOTIV Moskva             6-0  Torpedo Stalingrad 
   [Vasiliy Panfilov-2, Boris Pirogov-2, Boris Lagutin, Igor Petrov] 
 Torpedo Gorkiy               0-1  DINAMO Minsk 
   [Ratmir Perzhkhalo]

Third round replays
 [Aug 25] 
 TTU Tbilisi                  1-4  SPARTAK Ashkhabad 
   [Shudra – Mavrin, Borkin, Pavlidi, Gaygarov] 
 [Sep 5] 
 Daugava Riga                 0-3  DINAMO Leningrad 
   [Vasiliy Fomin, Alexei Kolobov, Vladimir Tsvetkov] 
 [Oct 11] 
 NEFTYANIK Baku               2-0  VMS Moskva 
   [Kagakov, Mamedov]

Fourth round
 [Oct 5] 
 Spartak Ashkhabad            2-3  DINAMO Leningrad 
   [Pavlidi-2 – Alexei Kolobov-2, Pyotr Dementyev] 
 [Oct 12] 
 SPARTAK Moskva               5-1  DO Sverdlovsk 
   [Nikita Simonyan-3, Nikolai Parshin, I.Dominskiy (D) og – B.Ivanov] 
 [Oct 15] 
 DINAMO Moskva                4-1  DO Vilnius 
   [Vladimir Ilyin 42, Alexandr Tenyagin 68, 76, Vitaliy Zub 88 – Visneuskas 8] 
 [Oct 16] 
 VVS Moskva                   2-1  Dinamo Minsk                 [aet] 
   [Vsevolod Bobrov 32, 118 – Fyodor Vanzel 67] 
 ZENIT Leningrad              2-0  Lokomotiv Kharkov 
   [Nikolai Smirnov 53, Alexandr Ivanov 80] 
 [Oct 17] 
 DO Kiev                      2-1  Lokomotiv Moskva 
   [A.Bogdanovich-2 – Vasiliy Panfilov] 
 [Oct 19] 
 TORPEDO Moskva               4-0  Neftyanik Baku           [in Kharkov] 
   [Vladimir Nechayev 18, Vitaliy Vatskevich 57, Yuriy Chaiko ?, Ivan Gorovoi ?] 
 [Oct 20] 
 MVO Kalinin                  2-1  Dinamo Tbilisi           [in Kiev] 
   [Anatoliy A.Ilyin 30, Yuriy Nyrkov 75 – Mikhail Jojua ?]

Quarterfinals
 [Oct 19] 
 DINAMO Leningrad             2-0  VVS Moskva 
   [Vasiliy Fomin 17, 54] 
 [Oct 21] 
 SPARTAK Moskva               3-0  Dinamo Moskva            [in Kiev] 
   [Nikita Simonyan 20, 63, Alexandr Rystsov 23] 
 [Oct 23] 
 TORPEDO Moskva               3-1  Zenit Leningrad          [in Kharkov] 
   [Valentin Petrov 5, Vladimir Nechayev 16, Vitaliy Vatskevich 19 – Nikolai Smirnov 62] 
 [Oct 24] 
 DO Kiev                      2-0  MVO Kalinin 
   [Bondarenko 3, 32]

Semifinals
 [Oct 28] 
 SPARTAK Moskva               2-0  DO Kiev 
   [N.Gorbunov (D) 15 og, Nikolai Parshin 30] 
 [Oct 29] 
 TORPEDO Moskva               2-1  Dinamo Leningrad             [aet] 
   [Vitaliy Vatskevich 74, Yuriy Zolotov ? – Alexei Kolobov 56]

Final

External links
 Complete calendar. helmsoccer.narod.ru
 1952 Soviet Cup. Footballfacts.ru
 1952 Soviet football season. RSSSF

Soviet Cup seasons
Cup
Soviet Cup
Soviet Cup